Adelino Augusto Lopes (born 21 November 1976 in Bissau), commonly known as Lino, is a Guinea-Bissauan retired footballer who played as a right back.

External links

1976 births
Living people
Sportspeople from Bissau
Bissau-Guinean footballers
Association football defenders
Primeira Liga players
Liga Portugal 2 players
Segunda Divisão players
Varzim S.C. players
C.S. Marítimo players
Portimonense S.C. players
S.C. Lusitânia players
Allsvenskan players
Assyriska FF players
First Professional Football League (Bulgaria) players
PFC Cherno More Varna players
PFC Beroe Stara Zagora players
FC Lokomotiv 1929 Sofia players
Guinea-Bissau international footballers
Bissau-Guinean expatriate footballers
Expatriate footballers in Portugal
Expatriate footballers in Sweden
Expatriate footballers in Bulgaria
Bissau-Guinean expatriate sportspeople in Portugal
Bissau-Guinean expatriate sportspeople in Sweden
Bissau-Guinean expatriate sportspeople in Bulgaria